Margaret Bourke-White (June 14, 1904 – August 27, 1971) was an American photographer and documentary photographer. She was arguably best known as the first foreign photographer permitted to take pictures of Soviet industry under the Soviets' first five-year plan, as the first American female war photojournalist, and for taking the photograph (of the construction of Fort Peck Dam) that became the cover of the first issue of Life magazine. She died of Parkinson's disease at age 67.

Early life 
Margaret Bourke-White, born Margaret White in the Bronx, New York, was the daughter of Joseph White, a non-practicing Jew whose father came from Poland, and Minnie Bourke, who was of Irish Catholic descent. She grew up near Bound Brook, New Jersey (the Joseph and Minnie White House in Middlesex), and graduated from Plainfield High School in Union County. From her naturalist father, an engineer and inventor, she claimed to have learned perfectionism; from her "resourceful homemaker" mother, she claimed to have developed “an unapologetic desire for self-improvement." Her younger brother, Roger Bourke White, became a prominent Cleveland businessman and high-tech industry founder, and her older sister, Ruth White, became well known for her work at the American Bar Association in Chicago, Ill. Roger Bourke White described their parents as "Free thinkers who were intensely interested in advancing themselves and humanity through personal achievement", attributing the success of their children in part to this quality. He was not surprised at his sister Margaret's success, saying "[she] was not unfriendly or aloof".

Margaret's interest in photography began as a hobby in her youth, supported by her father's enthusiasm for cameras. Despite her interest, in 1922, she began studying herpetology at Columbia University, only to have her interest in photography strengthened after studying under Clarence White (no relation). She left after one semester, following the death of her father. She transferred colleges several times, attending the University of Michigan (where she was a photographer at the Michiganensian and became a member of Alpha Omicron Pi sorority), Purdue University in Indiana, and Western Reserve University in Cleveland, Ohio. Bourke-White ultimately graduated from Cornell University with a Bachelor of Arts degree in 1927, leaving behind a photographic study of the rural campus for the school's newspaper, including photographs of her famed dormitory, Risley Hall. A year later, she moved from Ithaca, New York, to Cleveland, Ohio, where she started a commercial photography studio and began concentrating on architectural and industrial photography.

Career

Architectural and commercial photography 
One of Bourke-White's clients was Otis Steel Company. Her success was due to her skills with both people and her technique. Her experience at Otis is a good example. As she explains in Portrait of Myself, the Otis security people were reluctant to let her shoot for many reasons. Firstly, steel making was a defense industry, so they wanted to be sure national security was not endangered. Second, she was a woman, and in those days, people wondered if a woman and her delicate cameras could stand up to the intense heat, hazard, and generally dirty and gritty conditions inside a steel mill. When she finally got permission, technical problems began. Black-and-white film in that era was sensitive to blue light, not the reds and oranges of hot steel (In the words of her collaborator, the ambient red-orange light had no "actinic value"), so she could see the beauty, but the photographs were coming out all black.My singing stopped when I saw the films. I could scarcely
recognize anything on them. Nothing but a half-dollar-sized disk
marking the spot where the molten metal had churned up in the
ladle. The glory had withered.

I couldn't understand it. "We're woefully underexposed," said
Mr. Bemis. "Very woefully underexposed. That red light from
the molten metal looks as though it's illuminating the whole
place. But it's all heat and no light. No actinic value."
She solved this problem by bringing along a new style of magnesium flare, which produces white light, and having assistants hold the flares to light her scenes. Her abilities resulted in some of the best steel-factory photographs of that era, which earned her national attention.
"To me... industrial forms were all the more beautiful because they were never designed to be beautiful.  They had a simplicity of line that came from their direct application of purpose. Industry... had evolved an unconscious beauty – often a hidden beauty that was waiting to be discovered"

Photojournalism

In 1929 Bourke-White accepted a job as associate editor and staff photographer of Fortune magazine, a position she held until 1935. In 1930 she became the first Western photographer allowed to enter the Soviet Union.

Henry Luce hired her as the first female photojournalist for Life magazine in 1936. She held the title of staff photographer until 1940, but returned from 1941 to 1942, and again in 1945, after which she stayed through her semi-retirement in 1957 (which ended her photography for the magazine) and her full retirement in 1969.

Her photographs of the construction of the Fort Peck Dam featured in Lifes first issue, dated November 23, 1936, including the cover. Though Bourke-White titled the photo, New Deal, Montana: Fort Peck Dam, "it is actually a photo of the spillway located three miles east of the dam", according to a United States Army Corps of Engineers webpage. This cover photograph became such a favorite that it was the 1930s' representative in the United States Postal Service's Celebrate the Century series of commemorative postage stamps. 

During the mid-1930s, Bourke-White, like Dorothea Lange, photographed drought victims of the Dust Bowl. In the February 15, 1937, issue of Life magazine, her famous photograph of black flood-victims standing in front of a sign which declared, "World's Highest Standard of Living", showing a white family, was published. The photograph later would become the basis for the artwork of Curtis Mayfield's 1975 album, There's No Place Like America Today. Bourke-White and then husband Erskine Caldwell collaborated on You Have Seen Their Faces (1937), a book about conditions in the South during the Great Depression.

She also traveled to Europe to record how Germany, Austria, and Czechoslovakia were faring under Nazism.

Soviet Union 

Bourke-White was "the first Western professional photographer permitted into the Soviet Union". She travelled there in consecutive summers from 1930-32 to document the first Five-Year Plan. While in the USSR, she photographed Joseph Stalin, as well as making portraits of Stalin's mother and great-aunt when visiting Georgia. She also took portraits of other famous people in the Soviet Union, such as Karl Radek, Sergei Eisenstein, and Hugh Cooper. She noted that the trips and work there required a lot of patience, and generally had mixed, yet positive impressions of the USSR. Her photographs were first published in Fortune magazine in 1931 under the title Eyes on Russia, and then as a book with the same name by Simon and Schuster. These photos additionally became "a six-part series in The New York Times (1932), a deluxe photo portfolio (1934), and a set of photomurals for the Soviet consulate in New York (1934). Still other photographs circulated in exhibitions, books, and periodicals around the globe, especially in Soviet magazines and postcards of the early 1930s."

Bourke-White returned to the Soviet Union in 1941 during the Second World War. With 5 cameras, 22 lenses, 4 developing tanks and 3,000 flashbulbs, her luggage total was 600 pounds. The resulting body of work was published in a book titled Shooting the Russian War in 1942.

World War II
Bourke-White was the first known female war correspondent, as well as the first woman to be allowed to work in combat zones during World War II. In 1941 she traveled to the Soviet Union just as Germany broke its pact of non-aggression. She was the only foreign photographer in Moscow when German forces invaded. Taking refuge in the U.S. Embassy, she then captured the ensuing firestorms on camera.

As the war progressed, she was attached to the U.S. Army Air Force in North Africa, then to the U.S. Army in Italy and later in Germany. She repeatedly came under fire in Italy in areas of fierce fighting. On January 22, 1943, Major Rudolph Emil Flack piloted the lead aircraft with Margaret Bourke-White (the first female photographer/writer to fly on a combat mission) aboard his 414th Bombardment Squadron B-17F and bombed the El Aouina Airdrome in Tunis, Tunisia.

"The woman who had been torpedoed in the Mediterranean, strafed by the Luftwaffe, stranded on an Arctic island, bombarded in Moscow, and pulled out of the Chesapeake when her chopper crashed, was known to the Life staff as 'Maggie the Indestructible.'" The incident in the Mediterranean refers to the sinking of the England-Africa bound British troopship SS Strathallan that she recorded in an article, "Women in Lifeboats", in Life, February 22, 1943. Though disliked by General Dwight D Eisenhower, she became friendly with his chauffeur/secretary, Irishwoman Kay Summersby, with whom she shared the lifeboat.

In the spring of 1945 she traveled throughout a collapsing Germany with Gen. George S. Patton. She arrived at Buchenwald, the notorious concentration camp, and later said, "Using a camera was almost a relief. It interposed a slight barrier between myself and the horror in front of me." After the war she produced a book entitled Dear Fatherland, Rest Quietly, a project that helped her come to grips with the brutality she had witnessed during and after the war.

The editor of a collection of Bourke-White's photographs wrote: "To many who got in the way of a Bourke-White photograph—and that included not just bureaucrats and functionaries but professional colleagues like assistants, reporters, and other photographers—she was regarded as imperious, calculating, and insensitive."

Korean War
She served as a photographer for Life during Korean War of 1950-1953.

Recording the India–Pakistan partition violence

Bourke-White is known equally well in both India and Pakistan for her photographs of Dr. Bhimrao Ramji Ambedkar at his home Rajgriha, Dadar in Mumbai on the occasion of a third impression of his book which was published in December 1940 as Thoughts on Pakistan (the book was republished in 1946 under the title India's Political What's What: Pakistan or Partition of India). These photographs were published on the Life magazine cover. She also photographed M. K. Gandhi (at his spinning wheel) and Pakistan's founder, Mohammed Ali Jinnah (upright in a chair).

She was "one of the most effective chroniclers" of the violence that erupted at the 1947 independence and partition of India and Pakistan, according to Somini Sengupta, who calls her photographs of the episode "gut-wrenching, and staring at them, you glimpse the photographer's undaunted desire to stare down horror". She recorded streets littered with corpses, dead victims with open eyes, and refugees with vacant eyes. "Bourke-White's photographs seem to scream on the page", Sengupta wrote.

Sixty-six of Bourke-White's photographs of the partition violence featured in a 2006 reissue of Khushwant Singh's 1956 novel about the disruption, Train to Pakistan. In connection with the reissue, many of the photographs in the book were displayed at "the posh shopping center Khan Market" in Delhi, India. "More astonishing than the images blown up large as life was the number of shoppers who seemed not to register them", Sengupta wrote. No memorial to the partition victims exists in India, according to Pramod Kapoor, head of Roli, the Indian publishing house coming out with the new book.

She had a knack for being at the right place at the right time: she interviewed and photographed Mohandas K. Gandhi just a few hours before his assassination in 1948. Alfred Eisenstaedt, her friend and colleague, said one of her strengths was that there was no assignment and no picture that was unimportant to her. She also started the first photography laboratory at Life magazine.

Awards
 Honorary Doctorate: Rutgers University, 1948
 Honorary Doctorate: University of Michigan (Ann Arbor), 1951
 Achievement Award: US Camera, 1963
 Honor Roll Award: American Society of Magazine Photographers, 1964

Later years 
In 1953, Bourke-White developed her first symptoms of Parkinson's disease. She was forced to slow her career to fight encroaching paralysis. In 1959 and 1961 she underwent several operations to treat her condition, which effectively ended her tremors but affected her speech. Bourke-White wrote an autobiography, Portrait of Myself, which was published in 1963 and became a bestseller, but she grew increasingly infirm and isolated in her home in Darien, Connecticut. A pension plan set up in the 1950s, "though generous for that time", no longer covered her health-care costs. She also suffered financially from her personal generosity and from "less-than-responsible attendant care".

Personal life
In 1924, during her studies, she married Everett Chapman, but the couple divorced two years later. Margaret White added her mother's surname, "Bourke" to her name in 1927 and hyphenated it. Bourke-White and novelist Erskine Caldwell were married from 1939 to their divorce in 1942.

Death
In 1971 she died at Stamford Hospital in Stamford, Connecticut, aged 67, from Parkinson's disease.

Publications

Works
 Eyes on Russia (1931)
 You Have Seen Their Faces (1937; with Erskine Caldwell) 
 North of the Danube (1939; with Erskine Caldwell) 
 Shooting the Russian War (1942)
 They Called it "Purple Heart Valley" (1944)
 Halfway to Freedom; a report on the new India (1949)
 Interview with India,(1950)
 Portrait of Myself. Simon Schuster. (1963). 
 Dear Fatherland, Rest Quietly (1946)
 The Taste of War (selections from her writings edited by Jonathan Silverman) 
 Say, Is This the USA? (Republished 1977) 
 The Photographs of Margaret Bourke-White

Biographies and collections
 Margaret Bourke-White: Photography of Design, 1927–1936 
 Margaret Bourke-White 
 Margaret Bourke-White: Photographer 
 Margaret Bourke-White: Adventurous Photographer 
 Power and Paper, Margaret Bourke-White: Modernity and the Documentary Mode 
 Margaret Bourke-White: A Biography by Vickie Goldberg (Harper & Row: 1986) 
 Bourke-White: A Retrospective, Collected and Circulated by the International Center of Photography, New York. Exhibition catalog United Technologies Corporation, 1988
 Margaret Bourke-White: Twenty Parachutes, Nazraeli Press, 2002 
 Margaret Bourke-White: The Early Work, 1922–1930 Selected, with an essay by Ronald E. Ostman and Harry Littel (David E Godine 2005) 
 For the World to See: The Life of Margaret Bourke-White by Jonathan Silverman 
 Down North: John Buchan and Margaret Bourke-White on the Mackenzie by John Brinckman 
 Witness to Life and Freedom: Margaret Bourke-White in India & Pakistan by Pramod Kapoor (Roli & Janssen 2010)

Legacy
Photographs by Bourke-White are in the Brooklyn Museum, the Cleveland Museum of Art, the New Mexico Museum of Art and the Museum of Modern Art in New York, as well as in the collection of the Library of Congress. A 160-foot-long photomural she created for NBC in 1933, for the Rotunda in the broadcaster's Rockefeller Center headquarters, was destroyed in the 1950s. In 2014, when the Rotunda and Grand Staircase leading up to it were rebuilt, the photomural was faithfully recreated in digital form on the 360-degree LED screens on the Rotunda's walls. It forms one of the stops on the NBC Studio Tour.

Many of her manuscripts, memorabilia, photographs, and negatives are housed in Syracuse University's Bird Library Special Collections section.

Exhibitions
Group
 John Becker Gallery, New York: 1931 (Photographs by Three Americans, with Ralph Steiner and Walker Evans)
 Museum of Modern Art, New York:1949 (Six Women Photographers, 1951 (Memorable Life Photographs))

Solo
 Annual Exhibition of Advertising Art, New York: 1931 (with Anton Bruehl; art works by others)
 Little Carnegie Playhouse, New York: 1932
 Rockefeller Center, New York: 1932
 Art Institute of Chicago: 1956
 Syracuse University, NY: 1966
 Carl Siembab Gallery, Boston: 1971
 Witkin Gallery, New York: 1971
 Andrew Dickson White Museum of Art, Cornell University, Ithaca: 1972 (retrospective)

Public collections
 Art Institute of Chicago, Chicago, IL
 Brooklyn Museum
 Cleveland Museum of Art
 Library of Congress
 Museum of Modern Art, New York City
 New Mexico Museum of Art
 Rijksmuseum Amsterdam

Posthumous accolades
 In 1990 she was inducted into the National Women's Hall of Fame. She was designated a Women's History Month Honoree in 1992 and again in 1994 by the National Women's History Project.
 In 2016 Bourke-White was inducted into International Photography Hall of Fame and Museum.

Media portrayals 
 Candice Bergen played her in the 1982 film Gandhi.
 Farrah Fawcett played her in the 1989 television movie, Double Exposure: The Story of Margaret Bourke-White.
 Megan Fox played a fictional character based on Margaret Bourke-White in the 2019 South Korean war film The Battle of Jangsari.

References

External links

1904 births
1971 deaths
20th-century American photographers
American people of Irish descent
American people of Polish-Jewish descent
American Protestants
American photojournalists
American women journalists
War correspondents of the Korean War
Women in war in East Asia
Case Western Reserve University alumni
Columbia University alumni
Cornell University alumni
Neurological disease deaths in Connecticut
Deaths from Parkinson's disease
Industrial photographers
People from the Bronx
People from Bound Brook, New Jersey
People from Darien, Connecticut
People from Middlesex, New Jersey
Photographers from the Bronx
Photography in India
Photography in the Soviet Union
Plainfield High School (New Jersey) alumni
American portrait photographers
Purdue University alumni
Social realist artists
University of Michigan alumni
World War II photographers
Women in World War II
Life (magazine) photojournalists
American women war correspondents
Members of the Society of Woman Geographers
20th-century American women photographers
Women photojournalists